Foss was an American rock band formed in El Paso, Texas in the early 1990s. It is known for former members Cedric Bixler-Zavala, who found success in the music industry as the singer for the rock bands At the Drive-In and the Mars Volta, as well as Beto O'Rourke, who later was a U.S. Representative and candidate for U.S. Senator, U.S. President, and Governor of Texas.

Typically described as a post-hardcore band, Foss's sound incorporated elements of punk rock, emo, and indie rock styles of the period. The members of Foss espoused the DIY ("Do-It-Yourself") ethic and were influenced by the independent label Dischord Records and punk zines like Maximumrocknroll. The band released a handful of recordings and embarked on two tours spanning parts of the United States and Canada. Foss appeared on Let's Get Real With Bill Lowrey, an evangelical show on El Paso public-access television, after tricking the show's producers into believing they were a Christian rock band. Video of the chaotic performance later resurfaced on YouTube.

The DIY ethos adopted by Foss informed some of O'Rourke's later political decisions, such as his Senate campaign's pledge not to accept financial contributions from PACs (political action committees). During the campaign, the press often remarked on Foss and O'Rourke's connection to Bixler-Zavala, who was by then a well-known musician. Political commentators noted that O'Rourke's past membership in a punk band likely boosted his credibility, image, and political appeal, particularly among younger voters. The Republican Party of Texas mockingly tweeted the cover of Foss's record The El Paso Pussycats, which depicts O'Rourke wearing a dress.

Background 

Born and raised in El Paso, Beto O'Rourke felt alienated from the city as an adolescent in the 1980s. He told The Texas Observer that, in the El Paso of his youth, "There was nothing dangerous. There was no energy. There was no risk." He was exposed to rock music at a young age and soon became an avid fan of punk rock. In a profile of O'Rourke for The Washington Post, Ben Terris wrote that the young O'Rourke "wanted nothing more than to get out of town", and that the band Foss was formed "with the hopes of traveling the world". El Paso's punk scene, though small, helped O'Rourke find a sense of community in the city.

O'Rourke left El Paso High School and began attending Woodberry Forest School, an all-male boarding school in Virginia. During school breaks he returned to El Paso and continued immersing himself in its punk scene. He frequented DIY shows at the local venue Campus Queen, where shows were organized by Ed Ivey of the punk band Rhythm Pigs. O'Rourke met Cedric Bixler-Zavala when the latter played a show at the Campus Queen in a Misfits cover band. Bixler-Zavala later said "[b]eing with [O'Rourke] is what turned me into the kind of musician I am today" and "[t]he way I make art, I learned it from Beto. He was learning as he went along, too, but he was sort of my older brother/mentor."

O'Rourke joined his first band, called Swipe, after he left El Paso to attend Columbia University in New York. Swipe played shows at bars and clubs in New York and once opened for the Olympia, Washington-based punk band Fitz of Depression.

History 

O'Rourke and Bixler-Zavala formed Foss along with Mike Stevens and Arlo Klahr. They took the name "Foss" from the Icelandic word for "waterfall". The members of Foss formed their own label, Western Breed Records, and issued a 7-inch record, titled The El Paso Pussycats. Reportedly titled after a failed television pilot about crime-fighting women, The El Paso Pussycats shows O'Rourke wearing a floral-pattern dress on its cover. The dress belonged to Maggie Asfahani, O'Rourke's girlfriend at the time, who later said "There's nothing particularly complicated about it—we were all hanging out, and someone thought it would be funny if we switched clothes, the girls and guys. That was all, just being different." Other Foss recordings included a self-titled demo and a full-length album, Fewel Street (sometimes spelled Fewell or St.). The label Western Breed later issued some of the earliest releases by Bixler-Zavala's band At the Drive-In.

Foss embarked on two tours of North America during O'Rourke's summer breaks following his sophomore and junior years in college. O'Rourke and Klahr organized the tours with the help of Book Your Own Fucking Life, a DIY guide published by Maximumrocknroll that provided resources and contacts for touring bands. On one of the tours, O'Rourke booked a gig as an opening act at a venue in San Francisco by calling, pretending to be a founder of Sub Pop, and claiming the band was about to be signed; the plan worked, but Foss was ejected after playing only two songs. While on tour, Foss met Feist, who was later a member of Broken Social Scene and solo artist.

In 1994, an El Paso public-access television show, Let's Get Real With Bill Lowrey, broadcast a Foss performance and interview. Because it was an evangelical program, Foss told the producers they played gospel and Christian rock in order to get on the show. The band quickly wrote a new song for their television debut. The host, Lowrey, later told The Washington Post: "Oh yeah, they kind of pulled a fast one on me. But we enjoyed it. Mostly I can't believe he grew up to be a functioning member of society."

Clips of Foss's performance on Let's Get Real later surfaced on YouTube. Matt Miller of Esquire described Foss' performance as "absolute chaos with the band hopping around and people screaming—you can imagine elderly '90s Texans turning this on and being absolutely terrified". Matthew Adams of The Dallas Morning News called the performance "complete chaos" and said that, based on O'Rourke's musical performances on his 2018 Senate campaign, his musical skills seemed to have improved since the 1990s.

Musical style and influences 

Andy Cush of Spin described Foss as a post-hardcore band. Foss has also been labeled "emo-punk", as first-wave emo was a significant influence on the band's sound. O'Rourke, a fan of bands on Dischord Records like Minor Threat and Rites of Spring, took inspiration from the label's independence and commitment to the DIY ethic, as he told Cush in 2017:

Bixler-Zavala recalled that O'Rourke introduced him to punk and indie bands like Rites of Spring and Dinosaur Jr., which shifted him away from his earlier musical interest in dub and rock bands like the Grateful Dead, The Black Crowes, and Blue Cheer. Klahr, a fan of punk and indie music from Australia and New Zealand, introduced his Foss bandmates to bands like The Saints, The Clean, and The Scientists.

Rolling Stone posted the Foss song "Rise"—courtesy of O'Rourke—in 2018, making the band's music widely available for the first time. Rolling Stones Tessa Stuart said the song was "lo-fi slacker rock" stylistically indebted to Fugazi and Guided by Voices. According to Eric Grubbs of the Dallas Observer, "Rise" was akin to "13 Songs-era Fugazi by way of Pavement's lo-fi masterpiece Slanted and Enchanted". Eduardo Cepeda of Remezcla detected the influence of Rites of Spring and Government Issue. Michael Roffman at Consequence of Sound said "Rise" was a "chalky slice of alternative rock that wouldn't be out of place on a compilation album alongside Sunny Day Real Estate".

After Foss 
Foss disbanded in part because O'Rourke realized he "wasn't that good at" playing music. In addition, O'Rourke said, his father pressured him about the student loans he had taken out to attend Columbia University.

After leaving Foss, O'Rourke performed with several other bands, including Fragile Gang, the Swedes, and the Sheeps. Between 1999 and 2002, O'Rourke ran an alt-weekly newspaper, Stanton Street, with his former Foss bandmate Stevens as the managing editor. When O'Rourke was a member of the El Paso City Council, he said his former Foss bandmates had "all gone on to successful musical careers, confirming their talent and my lack thereof".

Bixler-Zavala later gained notice as the singer of post-hardcore band At the Drive-In and Grammy Award-winning progressive rock band the Mars Volta, in addition to numerous other musical endeavors. The first published mention of Foss came in a post at the webzine Buddyhead, published shortly before the release of At the Drive-In's third album Relationship of Command(2000). In the 2005 book New Wave of American Heavy Metal, a guide to hundreds of American and Canadian bands in metal and related genres, the entry for At the Drive-In mentions Foss as "Faus".

Impact on Beto O'Rourke's political career 

In March 2017, when O'Rourke—then a member of the U.S. House of Representatives—announced that he was running in the 2018 US Senate election in Texas, numerous publications commented on O'Rourke's musical past. Music news outlets like Spin, Pitchfork, Alternative Press, and Consequence of Sound reported on O'Rourke's campaign by noting his connection with Bixler-Zavala, who had by then become a notable figure in rock music. The news service Reuters described O'Rourke as an "ex-punk rocker" in a headline and detailed his time with Foss. By March 2018, Dan Solomon of Texas Monthly remarked that O'Rourke "seemingly can't escape a single profile without the words 'punk rock Democrat' appearing in the headline".

O'Rourke often highlighted his days with Foss in interviews. Political observers and journalists felt that O'Rourke's punk past became an important element of his image and political outlook. In an op-ed for The New York Times, Mimi Swartz expressed her belief that O'Rourke's former membership in a punk band had likely boosted his appeal with millennials. Foss's records were cited as evidence that O'Rourke had adopted his nickname prior to his political career.

O'Rourke's former Foss bandmates supported his Senate campaign. Stevens played with his band 83 Skiddoo for an O'Rourke fundraiser in Springfield, Missouri. Bixler-Zavala expressed his support for O'Rourke several times and, after O'Rourke lost the election, tweeted "I can only hope you run for president".

On August 28, 2018, after O'Rourke had declined a debate against the incumbent Ted Cruz, the Republican Party of Texas's Twitter account tweeted "Maybe Beto can't debate Ted Cruz because he already had plans", attaching the cover of Foss's record The El Paso Pussycats with the caption "Sorry, can't debate. We have a gig." Though the tweet mocked O'Rourke, it was widely reported as inadvertently making him look appealing. Others interpreted the tweet as intended, and the Texas GOP briefly responded to the backlash.

On March 3, 2020, Cedric Bixler-Zavala denounced O'Rourke for his endorsement of 2020 presidential candidate Joe Biden. Bixler-Zavala, a supporter of Bernie Sanders, responded to a follower on Instagram who said O'Rourke's support of Biden “bummed me out bad” to which Bixler-Zavala responded, “me too.”

Personnel 
 Cedric Bixler-Zavala – drums, vocals
 Arlo Klahr – guitar, vocals
 Beto O'Rourke – bass guitar, vocals
 Mike Stevens – guitar, vocals

Discography

Albums
 Fewel Street (1995)

EPs
 The El Paso Pussycats (1993)
 Foss (1993)

Notes

References

External links 
 
 Foss at Myspace (defunct; archival link via the Internet Archive)
 Vinyl rip of Foss's The El Paso Pussycats via SoundCloud, provided to Remezcla courtesy of Cedric Bixler-Zavala

Beto O'Rourke
Musical groups from El Paso, Texas
Alternative rock groups from Texas
Punk rock groups from Texas
American post-hardcore musical groups
American emo musical groups
Musical groups established in 1993
Musical groups disestablished in 1995
1993 establishments in Texas
1995 disestablishments in Texas
DIY culture
Politics of Texas
Musical quartets